Morton Smith Wilkinson (January 22, 1819February 4, 1894) was an American politician.

Born in Skaneateles, New York, he moved to Illinois in 1837 and was employed in railroad work for two years. Upon returning to Skaneateles in 1840, he studied law, was admitted to the bar in 1842, and commenced practice in Eaton Rapids, Michigan in 1843. He moved to Stillwater, Minnesota in 1847.

Wilkinson was elected to the first legislature of Minnesota Territory in 1849 and served as Register of Deeds of Ramsey County 1851 – 1853. After moving to Mankato, Minnesota in 1858, he served as a member of the board of commissioners to prepare a code of laws for the Territory of Minnesota in 1858.

He served in the United States Senate from March 4, 1859 to March 3, 1865, as a Republican from Minnesota, in the 36th, 37th and 38th congresses, but was an unsuccessful candidate for reelection. In the Senate, he was chairman of the Committee on Revolutionary Claims. He was a member of the United States House of Representatives from March 4, 1869 to March 3, 1871, but unsuccessful candidate for renomination in 1870.

Wilkinson moved to Wells, Minnesota, and was member of the Minnesota State Senate 1874 – 1877 as well as a prosecuting attorney of Faribault County 1880 – 1884.  He died in Wells on February 4, 1894, and was interred in Glenwood Cemetery, Mankato, Blue Earth County, Minnesota.

References
Minnesota Legislators Past and Present

1819 births
1894 deaths
Members of the Minnesota Territorial Legislature
Minnesota state senators
People from Skaneateles, New York
Republican Party United States senators from Minnesota
Politicians from Mankato, Minnesota
Republican Party members of the United States House of Representatives from Minnesota
19th-century American politicians
People from Eaton Rapids, Michigan
People from Stillwater, Minnesota
People from Wells, Minnesota